Crying Your Knife Away is an unofficial live album by Guided By Voices, released in 1994.

Tracklist 
 Postal Blowfish
 The Closer You Are The Quicker It Hits You
 My Valuable Hunting Knife
 Gold Star For Robot Boy
 Lethargy
 Striped White Jets
 Non-Absorbing
 Gold Heart Mountain Top Queen Directory
 Shocker In Gloomtown
 Motor Away
 Awful Bliss
 Tractor Rape Chain
 Blimps Go 90
 Exit Flagger
 I Am A Scientist
 Quality Of Armor
 Cruise
 Unleashed! The Large Hearted Boy
 Some Drilling Implied
 If We Wait
 Weed King
 Pimple Zoo
 Break Even
 Esters Day
 Invisible Man

References 

1994 live albums
Guided by Voices albums